The 1884 Open Championship was the 24th Open Championship, held 3 October at Prestwick Golf Club in Prestwick, South Ayrshire, Scotland. Jack Simpson won the Championship by four strokes, ahead of runners-up Willie Fernie and Douglas Rolland.

This was the first Open Championship to be played at Prestwick after it had been extended from 12 to 18 holes in 1882. The contest was still over 36 holes but  consisted of two 18-hole rounds rather than three 12-hole rounds.

Conditions were difficult with a strong wind. Simpson, one of the early starters, had the best score in both rounds and was the surprise winner. Fernie and Rolland were joint second and shared the second and third prizes.

Final leaderboard
Source:

Friday, 3 October 1884

Individual round scores are only known for the leading six players.

References

External links
Prestwick 1884 (Official site)
1884 Open Championship (GolfCompendium.com)

The Open Championship
Golf tournaments in Scotland
Open Championship
Open Championship
Open Championship